The  is a trough that lies off the coast of Suruga Bay in Japan, forming part of the Nankai Trough, the latter being responsible the source of many large earthquakes in Japan's history. Both mark the boundary of the Philippine Sea Plate subducting under the Amurian Plate.

See also

 Japan Median Tectonic Line
 List of earthquakes in Japan
 Sagami Trough

Subduction zones
Geology of Japan
Oceanic trenches of the Pacific Ocean